The 2007–08 season was VfB Stuttgart's 43rd season in the Bundesliga.

Team kit
The team kit for the season was produced by Puma and the shirt sponsor is EnBW.

Players

First-team squad
Squad at end of season

VfB Stuttgart II
VfB Stuttgart II were coached by Rainer Adrion. They finished 3rd in the Regionalliga Süd, securing qualification for the inaugural 3. Liga season.

Transfers

In
 Summer transfer window

Winter transfer window

Out
Summer transfer window

Winter transfer window

Players out on loan

Statistics
 Last updated on 12 May 2008.

Appearances and goals

|-
|colspan="10"|Players sold or loaned out during the 2008 winter transfer window:

|}

Disciplinary record
 Disciplinary records for 2007–08 league matches. Players with 1 card or more included only.

Club
ManagementOther information

Premiere Ligapokal

Semi-finals

Bundesliga

Classification

Results summary

Results by round

Matches

UEFA Champions League

Group stage

Disciplinary record
 Players with 1 card or more included only.

DFB Cup

Round 1

Round 2

Round 3

Quarter-finals

Disciplinary record
 Players with 1 card or more included only.

References

External links
 VfB Stuttgart official website

Notes

2007-08
Stuttgart